Gibizinho (lit. Little Comic Book) was a title of a comic book created by Editora Globo that was published between 1991 and 1998, at first as a weekly magazine that often varied the character in each issue between characters by Mauricio de Sousa and other licensed characters who had comics published by Globo like the Mexican characters El Chavo del Ocho and El Chapulin Colorado or celebrities like Xuxa and Leandro & Leonardo. Starting in 1993, the title of the comic became monthly and started to focus only on Monica and Friends being renamed as Gibizinho da Mônica. The comic books were characterized by their pocket format in a small size of between 13.5 x 9.5 cm and short stories.

Inspirations 
Previously, between December 1984 and January 1985, 6 mini-magazines were sold as gifts together with Monica and Friends''' comics sold by Editora Abril, each one featuring a different character. Later, in 1988, other small comics were given away in partnership with Danone products, which also sold a few Os Trapalhões'' mini comics in the same year.

Titles 
Characters that had their own titles in the early issues between 1991 and 1992.

Monica - 8 issues (before 1993)
Blu - 4 issues
Angel - 3 issues
Pitheco - 2 issues
Jimmy Five - 5 issues
Lionel's Kingdom - 2 issues
Bubbly the Astronaut - 3 issues
Tina - 4 issues
Smudge - 6 issues
Maggy - 6 issues
Tom-Tom - 2 issues
Curly - 4 issues
Chuck Billy - 6 issues
Horacio - 3 issues
Franklin - 2 issues
Bug-a-Booo - 3 issues
Sergio Mallandro - 1 issue
Leandro & Leonardo - 9 issues
Turma do Arrepio - 9 issues
Xuxa - 7 issues
El Chavo del Ocho - 4 issues
El Chapulin Colorado - 5 issues
Paquitas - 1 issue
Pelezinho - 2 issues
Vanilla - 1 issue
Puff - 1 issue

References

Brazilian comics titles
1991 comics debuts
1998 comics endings
Humor comics
Monica's Gang
El Chavo del Ocho
Xuxa